Plácido Domingo's Operalia, The World Opera Competition is an annual international competition for opera singers. Founded in 1993 by Plácido Domingo, the competition's varied prizes have been given to known artists such as Joseph Calleja, Rolando Villazón, José Cura, Joyce DiDonato, Elizabeth Futral, Nina Stemme, Erwin Schrott, Sonya Yoncheva and Lise Davidsen.

Overview
The competition's parent organization, Operalia Foundation, is a nonprofit organization based in Beverly Hills, California, with postal address in New York City's Upper West Side. The competition itself takes place in different cities each year.

Rules
The competition is open to singers of all voice types between the ages of 18 and 32 who are already performing professionally. Applicants are required to submit two recent video recordings of them singing with piano or live orchestra. Based on these submissions, 40 singers get selected for the competition. According to Operalia, the organization receives 800 to 1.000 submissions each year, other sources speak of "hundreds" of applications.

The jury is presided over by Domingo, although he himself does not judge the competition. Among jury members are Domingo's wife Marta Domingo, singers, opera directors, casting directors, artistic directors and consultants of renowned opera houses.

Competitors must prepare four arias. Two additional zarzuela arias are required for the optional zarzuela competition. In the first round each of the 40 singers gets to choose one aria they want to sing, the jury selects a second aria and the zarzuela aria from the contestant's list. Twenty singers are eliminated in the first round. The second round involves the performance of one aria chosen by the jury, after which ten singers proceed to the final round. For the final round, singers choose one aria and one zarzuela from their list.

While the jury deliberates the numerous winners, the audience votes for their favorite female and male singers. The final round is performed with orchestra, quarter and semi finals are with piano accompaniment.

Prizes
In the general competition 1st prize, 2nd prize, and 3rd prize are awarded. Winners of the zarzuela competition receive the Plácido Domingo Ferrer Prize or Pepita Embil Prize, named after Domingo's parents. The audience prize is a wristwatch by the competition's main sponsor. The San Juan, Puerto Rico based nonprofit organization CulturArte de Puerto Rico is sponsoring the CulturArte Prize. Performers of German repertoire by Richard Strauss or Richard Wagner can receive the Birgit Nilsson Prize. Prizes can be shared, in the past by up to 4 singers for one prize. It is also possible for a singer to receive several awards. Up to 17 prizes have been awarded in a single year. Since 2017, finalists who didn't win a prize receive an Encouragement Award.

Chances of winning
In the 27 competitions from 1993 to 2019, 219 singers received prizes. 151 received one prize, 52 two, 15 three, and one singer received four prizes at the Lisbon competition in 2018. The most prizes had been awarded at the competition in 2009, with 17 prizes for 10 singers. Without counting the Encouragement Award, one out of five singers received a prize.

List of winners

See also
List of classical music competitions

References

External links

 
Arts organizations established in 1993
Annual events
1993 establishments in California